Hypocosmia is a genus of snout moths. It was described by Émile Louis Ragonot in 1891.

Species
 Hypocosmia bimaculalis Dyar, 1914 (from Panama)
 Hypocosmia definitalis Ragonot, 1891 (from Venezuela)
 Hypocosmia floralis (Stoll in Cramer & Stoll, 1872) (from Suriname)
 Hypocosmia pyrochroma (E. D. Jones, 1912) (from Brazil)
 Hypocosmia rectilinealis Dyar, 1914 (from Panama)

References

Lin Besaans (2011) "Hypocosmia pyrochroma Jones, a leaf-tying moth released as a biocontrol of cat's claw creeper". - ARC-PPRI Fact Sheets on Invasive Alien Plants and their Control in South Africa. www.arc.agric.za

Chrysauginae
Pyralidae genera
Taxa named by Émile Louis Ragonot